L'Alpe d'Huez Film Festival, established in 1997, is a film festival dedicated to comedy cinema. It takes place every year in Alpe d'Huez during the third week of January and offers a free program and free entrance composed of many screenings, short and feature films. The screenings take place all day in the halls of the Palais des Sports et  Congresses of Alpe d'Huez. The films of the official selection, in competition and out of competition, are projected in national preview in the presence of the casts and crews of the films.

References

External links
 Site officiel
Film festivals held in multiple countries
1997 establishments in France
Film festivals in France